A constitutional referendum was held in Panama on 30 August 1998. Voters were asked whether they approved of amending the 1972 constitution to allow the President and Vice President to be re-elected for a second term and dismissal of MPs by their own parties. Only 34.3% voted in favour of the reforms, with a turnout of 65.4%.

Results

References

1998 referendums
1998
1998 in Panama
Constitutional referendums